Genesis of 2PM is the third Japanese studio album (sixth album overall) by South Korean boy band 2PM. It was released on January 29, 2014 as their first album release under Sony Music Japan sublabel Epic Records Japan in three editions:

 Regular edition: CD 
 Limited Edition A: CD + DVD 
 Limited Edition B: CD + CD 

There are nine new tracks in this third Japanese studio album. Tracks from both Give Me Love and Winter Games are also included in this album.

The album debuted at number one on the Weekly Oricon Albums Chart.

Track listing

Release history

Oricon charts

References

External links
 Japanese Official Website

2014 albums
2PM albums
Japanese-language albums
Epic Records albums
Sony Music Entertainment Japan albums